Alfred Hearn Healey (13 July 1875 – 9 September 1960) was a British athlete in the 1906 Intercalated Games and the 1908 Summer Olympics.

He competed for Great Britain in the 1906 Intercalated Games held in Athens, Greece in the 110 metre hurdles where he won the silver medal. In the 100 metre event he was eliminated in the semi-finals.

Two years later he was also eliminated in the semi-finals of the 110 metre hurdles competition.

References

External links 
 
 

1875 births
1960 deaths
British male sprinters
British male hurdlers
Olympic athletes of Great Britain
Athletes (track and field) at the 1906 Intercalated Games
Athletes (track and field) at the 1908 Summer Olympics
Olympic silver medallists for Great Britain
Medalists at the 1906 Intercalated Games